"If It's Love" is a song by German recording artist Daniel Schuhmacher. It was written by Boris Schmidt and Florian Prengel and produced by Thorsten Brötzmann for his second studio album, Nothing to Lose (2010). Released as the album's second single, following his departure from Sony Music, it reached number thirty on the German Albums Chart.

Formats and track listings

Charts

References

External links
  
 

2009 singles
2009 songs
Daniel Schuhmacher songs